Potamus Park is a British pre-school television programme that ran on CITV in the United Kingdom between 1995 and 2002, and on the Disney Channel in the United States in 2005. The show centred on a small family of hippopotamuses, Herbie, Hippy, Hazel and Hinkley, this show was sponsored by Hippo Fromage Frais and was filmed at Pinewood Studios in Iver Heath, England.

Characters
Characters featured included Ticker, (a bird,) Got To Guess, (a blue creature that used sign language to communicate) and Mindy and Mo (two Moles who live in a water well and use a bucket as a lift whenever the hippopotamuses need help). Every episode was introduced by three anthropomorphic flowers, who would explain whatever is to come or what may have been happening in the episode.

Series 1 - (1996)
 Pleased To Meet You (By Paul Cole) - 3 January 1996
 How Does Your Garden Grow? (By Paul Cole) - 10 January 1996
 Litter Bug (By Paul Cole) - 17 January 1996
 Over The Counter (By Paul Cole) - 24 January 1996
 Recipe For Success (By Paul Cole) - 31 January
 Do It Yourself (By Paul Cole) 7 - February 1996
 Too Hot For Hippos (By Paul Cole 14 - February 1996
 Happy Hippos (By Paul Cole) 21 - February 1996
 Crazy Golf (By Paul Endacott) 28 - February 1996
 Name That Tune (By Paul Cole) 6 - March 1996
 This Is Where We Live (By Paul Cole) 10 - September 1996
 Gone Fishing (By Paul Cole) 17 - September 1996
 Spring Clean (By Paul Cole) 24 - September 1996
 Let's Pretend (By Paul Cole 1 - October 1996
 Picture This (By Paul Cole) 8 - October 1996
 Hungry Hippos (By Wayne Jackman) 15 - October 1996
 I Spy (By Nigel Crowle) 22 - October 1996
 Keep Fit (By Paul Cole) 29 - October 1996
 Nothing Doing (By Peter Corey) 5 - November 1996
 You Must Be Joking (By Peter Corey) 12 - November 1996
 Secrets (By Wayne Jackman) 19 - November 1996
 Nice To Be Nice (By Paul Cole) 26 - November 1996
 Got To Guess Goes Missing (By Wayne Jackman) 3 - December 1996
 Ticker Takes Off (By David Treloar) 10 - December 1996
 The Show Must Go On (By Peter Corey) 17 - December 1996

Series 2 - (1997)
 Invitations To The Dance (By Paul Cole) - 7 January 1997
Episode 002 (By Paul Cole) - 14 January 1997
Episode 003 (Bu Paul Cole) - 21 January 1997
 Dressing Up 28 - January (By Paul Cole) - 28 January 1997
 Things That Go Bump In The Night (By Chris Noulton) 4 - February 1997
 Every Mole Has His Day (By Chris Noulton) 11 - February 1997
 Lonely Bird (By John Lee) 18 - February 1997
 I Talk To The Trees (By Paul Cole) 25 - February 1997
 Buried Treasure (By Paul Cole) 4 - March 1997
 Bedtime Story (By Paul Cole) 11 - March 1997
 Mums Day Off (By Paul Cole) 11 - September 1997
 Home Again (By Paul Cole) 18 - September 1997
 Bookworm (By Paul Cole) 25 - September 1997
 Where Shall We Go (By Paul Cole) 2 - October 1997
 Turn and Turn About (By Paul Cole) 9 - October 1997
 If At First (By Paul Cole) 16 - October 1997
 Bits and Bobs (By Paul Cole) 23 - October 1997
 We Have No Bananas (By Paul Cole) 30 - October 1997
 Abracadabra (By Paul Cole) 6 - November 1997
 Wash Day Blues (By Paul Cole) 13 - November 1997
 If Only (By Paul Cole) 20 - November 1997
 Doctor Doctor (By John Lee) 27 - November 1997

Series 3 - (1998)
 Do You Best (By John Lee) 6 - January 1998
 Hip Hippo Ray Day (By Paul Cole) 8 - January 1998
 Different (By Nigel Plaskitt) 13 - January 1998
 Ticker Tells All (By Paul Cole) 15 - January 1998
 Early One Morning (By Paul Cole) 20 - January 1998
 Table Manners (By Paul Cole) 22 - January 1998
 Episode 007 (By Paul Cole) 31 - March 1998
 Episode 008 (By Paul Cole) 2 - April 1998
 Episode 009 ((By Paul Cole) 7 - April 1998
 Episode 010 (By Paul Cole) 9 - April 1998
 Episode 011 (By Paul Cole) 14 - April 1998
 Episode 012 (By Paul Cole) 16 - April 1998
 Episode 013 (By Paul Cole) 21 - April 1998

Video Tapes
Various episodes of the series were released on VHS by Carlton Video in the United Kingdom.

Trivia
Carlton Home Video issued many video cassettes in the late 1990s and early 2000s. Although the television series was genuinely well received, ITV decided to cut the series in 1999 due to the rival show Bananas in Pyjamas, which received higher ratings. Even though the series ended in 1999, CITV continued to air repeated television programmes into the early 2000s.

References

Treehouse TV original programming
YTV (Canadian TV channel) original programming
ITV children's television shows
1990s British children's television series
1996 British television series debuts
1999 British television series endings
Fictional hippopotamuses
Films shot at Pinewood Studios
British television shows featuring puppetry
Television series by ITV Studios
Television shows produced by Central Independent Television
Television series produced at Pinewood Studios
English-language television shows
British preschool education television series
1990s preschool education television series